The Hullyeondae ( "Military Training Division") was a Korean Army Regiment established under Imperial Japanese direction as a part of the second Gabo Reform in 1895, the 32nd year of Gojong of Korea's reign. On January 17 in the same year, Japanese legation minister Inoue Kaoru suggested the king found a new regiment of Royal Guards. This elite regiment, trained and equipped by the Japanese, were officered by members of the old Korean Army.

The Regiment was composed of three battalions, and a headquarters company, totaling about 1000 Soldiers. The first battalion was commanded by Major Woo Beomseon. The second battalion was commanded by Major Yi Doohwang, and the third battalion was commanded by Major Yi Jinho. All of these commanders had participated successfully during operations against the Donghak peasant rebels and the Chinese Army in 1894–1895. The regiment was composed of the most progressive element of the Korean Army.

Convinced that Queen Min was conspiring with the Russians to bring their troops into the country, the Regiment attacked the Imperial Palace on 8 October 1895, allowing the ronin to kill the Empress.

See also
Korea under Japanese rule
Imo Incident
Empress Myeongseong

References

Military history of Korea
Japan–Korea relations